The Ocean Hop is a 1927 animated short subject film, produced by Charles Mintz and George Winkler and directed by Walt Disney. The film was reissued in 1932 by Walter Lantz Productions with added music and sound effects, and is the only known version to survive. The short entered the public domain on January 1, 2023.

Plot 
Oswald the Lucky Rabbit enters into an airplane race across the Atlantic Ocean. While there he encounters a mean rival, Peg Leg Pete, who taunts him and causes his plane to get glued to the ground with chewing gum. As Peg Leg Pete takes a lead, Oswald manages to construct a plane of balloons and a long dachshund dog. While at first managing to put up a good effort, Oswald is eventually shot down by Peg Leg Pete over Paris. After parachuting into Paris, Oswald is welcomed by the local patrons as he ended up winning the race.

Legacy 
 This short features Peg Leg Pete, an updated version of the Alice comedy character, Bootleg Pete. Peg Leg Pete appears as a bear in this short, but would later become a cat as the modern day Disney character, Pete. The plot of this short would later be re-purposed in a Mickey Mouse cartoon, Plane Crazy, in 1929. Both shorts were directed by Walt Disney and featured characters flying across the Atlantic Ocean.

Home media
The short was released on December 11, 2007, on Walt Disney Treasures: The Adventures of Oswald the Lucky Rabbit.

References

1927 films
1927 short films
1927 animated films
Public domain
1927 comedy films
1920s Disney animated short films
Oswald the Lucky Rabbit cartoons
American black-and-white films
American silent short films
Films directed by Walt Disney
Animated films without speech
Silent American comedy films